Artur Kogan (born 29 January 1974) is a Ukrainian–born Israeli chess grandmaster.

Kogan emigrated from Ukraine to Israel when he was two years old and spent more than 20 years in Israel.  He currently resides in Tarragona, Catalonia, Spain.

In 1981–89 he was the winner of town open championships in Israel of Bat Yam, Holon, Rishon LeZion, Petah Tikva, among others.

Among other tournaments, he has won the 1994 Kecskemét, 1996 Formies, 1996 Vlissingen, 1996 Sas Van Gent Open (Netherlands), 1996 Ischia (Italy), 1998 Ljubljana (Slovenia), 1998 Pyramiden Cup (Germany), 1999 Ljubliana, 2000 Almassora (Spain), 2000 Cutro Open (Italy), 2000 Quebec Open, 2001 Nordic Scandinavian Open, 2001 Salou Costa Dorada (Spain), 2002 Genove (Italy), 2003 Lido Estensi, 2005 Paris Open, 2005 Tarragona Open, 2006 Ashdod Open (Israel) and 2011 Torredembarra Open tournaments.

He was awarded the GM title in 1998.

As of May 2010 his FIDE rating was 2525.

External links 
 
 Kogan website
 Jeruchess bio
 "South African Nightmare – Decision of the CHESSA Ethics Committee; Chess South Africa; REPORT OF THE CHESSA ETHICS COMMITTEE IN REGARD TO THE COMPLAINT OF GM ARTHUR KOGAN AGAINST MR JACKIE NGUBENI," 12/8/06

1974 births
Living people
Ukrainian Jews
Chess grandmasters
Israeli chess players
Jewish chess players
Bukovina Jews
Ukrainian emigrants to Israel